Glubokovo is a rural locality (a village) in Mstyora Urban Settlement, Vyaznikovsky District, Vladimir Oblast, Russia. The population was 11 as of 2010.

Geography 
Glubokovo is located near the Klyazma River, 13 km northwest of Vyazniki (the district's administrative centre) by road. Stanki is the nearest rural locality.

References 

Rural localities in Vyaznikovsky District